Porphyromonas is a Gram-negative, non-spore-forming, obligately anaerobic and non-motile genus from the family Porphyromonadaceae. There were 16 different Porphyromonas species documented as of 2015, which reside in both animal and human reservoirs.  It was discovered more recently that Porphyromonas also exist in the environment, albeit to a lesser extent. This genus is notably implicated in the modulation of oral cavity, respiratory tract, and gastrointestinal tract disease states. It is suggested that Porphyromonas either operate as benign bacteria pertinent to host immunity or are potential pathobionts that opportunistically provoke diseased states when homeostasis is disrupted. Despite its characterization not being fully elucidated due to sparse research, various studies report the prevalence of this genus at 58.7% in healthy states compared with 41.3% in diseased states.

This genus was first reported in the oral cavity and is found specifically in the salivary microbiome. Porphyromonas are also commonly found in the microbiome of the human digestive tract, as shown by the Human Microbiome Project in general.

Distribution of Species 
While overlap exists between humans and animals in the distribution of Porphyromonas species, some species are more prevalent in each.

Humans 
P. asaccharolytica, P. endodontalis, P. gingivalis, P. catoniae, P. pasteri, P. somerae, and P. uenonis

Animals 
P. cangingivalis, P. canoris, P. cansulsi, P. circumdentaria, P. crevioricanis, P. gingivicanis, P. salivosa, P. macacae, P. gulae, and P. levii
Porphyromonas genus is commonly found in healthy stallion semen <(https://doi.org/10.1016/j.anireprosci.2020.106568)>

Environment 
Porphyromonas have been isolated from manmade and naturally occurring environments. Most of these species have been detected in manmade environments, including transportation systems, healthcare settings, and indoor facilities; Porphyromonas persist in naturally occurring environments such as air, soil, seawater, freshwater, agricultural sites, and alpine meadows to a lesser extent. Furthermore, waste-management sites are a pertinent source of environment-dwelling species. Specific environmentally hosted strains have not been widely studied or identified.

Health Impacts

Oral Cavity 

 P. ginvigalis: a gram-negative anaerobe and pathological agent of periodontitis.

Gastrointestinal Tract 

 Overabundance of this genus has been reported from the feces of patients diagnosed with colorectal cancer.

Respiratory Tract 

 Porphyromonas increase has been associated with pulmonary tuberculosis lesions.

Uterine Tract 

 P. levii: bacteria of high abundance in cows with uterine disease.

Other 
Alterations in Porphyromonas abundance have also been associated with various cancers, autoimmune and neurodegenerative conditions, vaginal diseases, rheumatoid arthritis, and Sjogren's syndrome.

Detection Methods 
Porphyromonas is most commonly detected via utilization of 16s rRNA sequencing techniques.

References

Further reading 
 
 
 
 
 
 
 "Porphyromonas - an overview | ScienceDirect Topics". www.sciencedirect.com. Retrieved 2022-12-01.

Bacteroidia
Bacteria genera